Today My Way is a 1965 album by Nancy Wilson for Capitol Records. It reached number 7 on the pop album charts and number 2 on the RnB charts.

Track listing

Side 1 
"Reach Out for Me"	(Burt Bacharach, Hal David) - 2:26
"Welcome, Welcome" (Kay Rogers, June Tancy) - 2:20
"My Love, Forgive Me (Amore, Scusami)"	(Mescoli, Pallavicini, Lee) - 2:23
"Dear Heart" (Henry Mancini, Ray Evans, Jay Livingston) - 2:07
"Don't Come Running Back To Me" (Sid Tepper, Roy C. Bennett) - 2:11
"And Satisfy" (Ronnell Bright) - 2:34

Side 2 
"You've Lost That Lovin' Feelin'" (Phil Spector, Barry Mann, Cynthia Weil) - 2:45
"Love Has Many Faces" (Mack David, David Raksin) - 1:49
"Take What I Have" (Jimmy Williams, Larry Harrison) - 2:17
"I'm All Smiles" (Herbert Martin, Michael Leonard) - 1:45
"If I Ruled the World" (Leslie Bricusse, Cyril Ornadel) - 2:20

Personnel 

 Nancy Wilson - vocals
 Sid Feller - arranger, conductor
 David Cavanaugh - producer

References

1965 albums
Nancy Wilson (jazz singer) albums
Capitol Records albums
Albums produced by Dave Cavanaugh
Albums arranged by Sid Feller
Albums conducted by Sid Feller